SMA Negeri 8 Jakarta (also known as SMANDEL) is a selective, coeducational public high school  in Jakarta, Indonesia. It is located on Jalan Taman Bukitduri, South Jakarta. The school is distinguished by Ministry of Education as Rintisan Sekolah Bertaraf Internasional (RSBI), or pioneering international school, and one of designated Excellent Schools in the province of Jakarta. The school is colloquially referred to as Delapan (Indonesian: Eight) by Jakartans.

SMA Negeri 8 Jakarta is known for its selective admission process, achievements in science competitions such as the National Science Olympiad, and an excellent performance of its students in the Indonesian university entrance examination known as SNMPTN. The school has been ranked as one of the best high schools in the country for multiple times. Many of its students study in University of Indonesia and Bandung Institute of Technology, considered Indonesia's most prestigious colleges along with Gadjah Mada University, as well as universities abroad, many of them pursue degrees in medicine and engineering.

History
SMA Negeri 8 Jakarta opened its doors on August 1, 1958. At that time, the school was located at Taman Slamet Rijadi. The present school building in Bukitduri was opened by Governor Ali Sadikin on March 30, 1971.

In 2004, the school became the resource center for the studies of physics and astronomy in Jakarta. Also in 2008, SMA Negeri 8 Jakarta started an international program in cooperation with Cambridge University.

Principals
 Drs. W.Y. Topanu
 Drs. Sukarno
 Drs. Suyono
 Dra. Hilma Dahnir
 Drs. Rosman Harahap
 Drs. Subroto 
 Drs. H. Kurdi S.
 Drs. H. Nurdin Amir
 Dra. Hj. Pangestuti
 Dra. Hj. Elida Agoes
 Dra. Hj. Elida Agoes
 Drs. H. Sugiarto,
 Drs. H. Triyana,
 Drs.H.Suhaman,
 Drs.H.Nanang Gunadi,
 Hj. Wieke Salehani,
 Hj. Nahdiana,
 Drs. Tulus Winardi,
 Drs. Agusman Anwar

Academics
The school curriculum adheres to the standard Indonesian high school curriculum. The duration of study is three years. In the first year, students take up to 17 classes each semester, i.e. three science classes, four social studies classes, four language classes, integrated math class, religion, civics, physical education, music, and IT. In the second year, students are streamed into science and social studies programs, this reduces the number of classes to about 14 per semester.

More than 80% of the students studying at SMA Negeri 8 Jakarta are streamed into the science program. Tutorials are mandatory for all students in grade 11 and 12. Teachers from a partner tutor school come to class twice a week to help students learn. Students take three foreign language classes, including English, German, and one elective foreign language class (Japanese, Mandarin, or French). At the end of senior year, students take the National Examination in order to receive a diploma.

The school offers Program Kelas Internasional (International Class Program) which is based on the British curriculum, and an academic accelerated program for gifted students.

Admission
Admission for RSBI class usually opens in April and can last until June. The applicants take multiple examinations to test their academic aptitudes, foreign language fluency, and computer literacy. In addition, every applicant undergoes an interview and a psychological testing. The admission officers take applicant's score in National Examination, a standardized test for all students who wish to graduate middle school, into account.

The International Class Program opens its admission earlier, usually in March. All the applicants wishing to be enrolled in international class undergo a similar process as applicants for RSBI class.

Two months after commencing their studies in high school, students of 10th grade who are attending RSBI class are eligible to apply for acceleration program. They then go through another selection process which involves their parents. Accepted students go to school six days a week (including lab on Saturday) and finish their high school in two years.

Student life
One characteristic of SMA Negeri 8 Jakarta is the number of students living in rental housings, known as kost, around the school. This is due to the fact that the school attracts students from different parts of the country, and therefore they have to leave their hometowns to study and live in South Jakarta, arguably the most affluent part of Jakarta. SMA Negeri 8 Jakarta is not a boarding school and therefore it does not provide any dormitories for its students, but rental housings are common in its neighborhood.

SMA Negeri 8 Jakarta is also known for its leadership enrichment programs. Upon entering high school, students are welcomed with a leadership training organized by faculty members. Later in the second semester, students attend a leadership program organized by student government on Tuesday, Thursday, and Saturday. This is the prerequisite for students to be able to participate in student groups. This is also one opportunity for underclassmen to get to know more about their upperclassmen.

Students of 11th grade participate in a trip to rural area called TeSIS (Temu Sosial Ilmiah Smandel), where they are hosted by local families. Students, in group, then conduct a research in science or social studies, and present their findings to teachers and researchers, mostly from universities and Indonesian Institute of Sciences. When this trip is coming to an end, student volunteers from both 10th and 11th grades hold a charity event involving locals.

Extracurricular activities
OSIS or student government is a part of student life at SMA Negeri 8 Jakarta. Students are encouraged to apply for membership at student government, which consists of executive and legislative branches. Pengurus OSIS is the executive branch with the membership of 18 students selected from a leadership development program to serve for 1 year. Perwakilan Kelas is the legislative branch, and among its duties are accommodating the aspirations of the student body and supervising events organized by student group. Membership of Perwakilan Kelas varies each year, but usually around 24 students are selected through a regeneration program commencing at the beginning of every academic year to serve for two years.

Students take part in at least one of ten non flexible listed student groups and organizations designated as subseksi (Indonesian: subsection). There are also flexible subseksi that students can join even if they already have one nonflexible subseksi. Subseksi are popular among students as a way to network with other students, faculty members, and alumni.

Every year, each subseksi organizes programs involving civitas academica and/or general public outside campus. The proposal of these programs is discussed in a plenary meeting with student government and faculty members, and the programs are then reviewed in another plenary meeting. The latest addition to student organization, General English Syndicate (Genesys), was founded in 2011. The structure of student government at the school is a mixture of the standard Indonesian high school system and Indonesian political system, a concept which was born after the official visit of the members of student government to Indonesian Parliament.

There are also non-subseksi student groups at the school. They are not under the realm of student government and do not organize events involving external parties. They include Study Club (for students wishing to compete in National and International Science Olympiad) and Bukit Duri Beavers (baseball and softball team).

List of subsections
Student government of SMA Negeri 8 Jakarta is divided into ten sections, each with assigned responsibility. Under each section, there is at least one student groups, designated as subseksi, which works similarly as clubs and societies in other schools, but with a more elaborate political structure.

Section I
Muslim Student Society
Protestant Student Society
Catholic Student Society
Section II
Subseksi Upacara (military-like society for flag bearers of flag ceremony)
Section III
Outdoor Club
Scout Movement
Section IV
Community Service
Section V
Media and Journalism
Photography 
Filmmaking
Print publication (magazine, yearbook)
Comics and illustration
Cyberdesign
Section VI
Student Research Club (Sains dan Perpustakaan)
Student Cooperative Society
Section VII
Sport Club
Badminton
Basketball
Handball
Martial arts
Soccer
Tennis
Volleyball
Red Cross Youth
Section VIII
Art Club
Band
Choir and vocal group
Classical music
Modern dance
Theater
Traditional dance
Traditional music
Section IX
Technology and Sound System
Section X
General English Syndicates
 Japan Club

Traditions

Student Groups regeneration
To be involved in official student groups recognized by student government and the school itself, students of the 10th grade undergo a regeneration process organized by the senior members of the groups, usually 11th graders. The regeneration period is a leadership program offered by the school which prepares students to be a participant of student life at SMA Negeri 8 Jakarta. Activities often includes hands on training, forum, and several group assignments. On the last day of the event, students spend the night together and they are later inaugurated by the student government as official members of the student groups.

Upacara Panji
A flag ceremony is conducted every Monday at virtually all Indonesian schools, but at this school, with the Independence Day Ceremony being an exception, there is one flag ceremony conducted only once a year. Upacara Panji is the inauguration ceremony for the officers serving for both branches of OSIS (central student government), where the names and positions of officeholders are officially announced by the Principal. It is also unique because it involves new students and it displays intricate military parade.

Event organizing
There are tons of student organized events every year. Most of them are listed as student group initiated programs, but all of them fall under the responsibility of Pengurus OSIS, the executive branch of student government, and are supervised by Perwakilan Kelas, the legislative branch.

Lampion or Delapan Championship (previously : 8Schoolastic, which stands for "8 School Art and Science National Competition" is the largest event held annually, when all parts of student government, including all the student groups, organize a large-scale event which involves art and science in the format of school competition. Sporting events, such as basketball, soccer, modern dance, photography, and band. A music concert by Indonesian performers also conducted at the closing ceremony of the event.

Festival Budaya 8, was founded in 2008 (previously : Bazar Budaya Murid 8) is an annual cultural exhibition that exhibits 20 different national and international culture.  There is also an art performance by students of SMA Negeri 8 Jakarta under the name of Collaboreight. It combines seven division of Art Subsection into one musical theater. It has grown into a national event involving students from Jabodetabek and outside the metropolitan area. Some participants fly from the easternmost province of Papua.

School identities

School song
Hymne Delapan is the official school song.
SMA Delapan giat belajar
Demi masa depan bangsa yang besar
Kami bersatu hati membangun negara
Untuk pertiwi tanah tercinta
Kami putra putri IndonesiaMembangun negara adil dan makmurKami bersatu hati membangun negaraUntuk pertiwi tanah tercinta''

English translation:
SMA 8, we study diligently
For the future of our great nation
We are united to develop the country
For our beloved homeland
We are the youth of Indonesia
Building our country prosperous and equitable
We are united to develop the country
For our beloved homeland

School logo
The official interpretation of the colors featured in the school logo is as follows:
 Black: knowledge shines through the darkness
 Blue: mental clarity
 Yellow: purity of the heart
 Red: courage

Symbols featured in the logo represent academic disciplines:
 Wing: economics
 Temple: humanities 
 Laboratory glassware: natural sciences
 Compass: mathematics

Partnerships
As a pioneering international school, the school has established relationships with schools abroad. Sister schools are located in Singapore, Thailand, Australia, and Turkey. Some foreign universities have also established partnerships with the school, and they visit SMA Negeri 8 Jakarta and organize information sessions.

SMA Negeri 8 Jakarta has graduates attending Indonesian universities, and each year there is a homecoming tradition for those alumni. They talk before the entire senior class to promote their colleges and help prospective university students prepare themselves for the admission process.

The school is one of the model schools in Indonesia. Other schools refer to its academic and organizational systems, and annually SMA Negeri 8 Jakarta receives tens of official visits from other schools, both domestic and international. In academic year 2009/2010, the school received 45 official visits. Faculty members and the members of central student government of the school visit schools as a part of comparative study. Some faculty members have been invited to officially visit schools in other parts of Southeast Asia as well as Australia.

The school offers homestay and cultural immersion opportunities for its students. Students travel to the United States, United Kingdom, or Australia with teachers as chaperons. Under the partnership with Singaporean and Japanese universities, it is possible for teachers and student alike to attend workshops and summer camps abroad. Students are selected each year to participate in exchange programs, where they study in foreign high schools and stay with local families. Students of the school have been sent to the United States, Switzerland, Belgium, Italy, France, and Norway to name a few.

SMA Negeri 8 Jakarta has a tradition of traditional performing arts, such as saman. Student performers have been invited to perform in Indonesia and overseas.

Notable alumni
Vena Annisa, broadcaster and VOA presenter
Mesty Ariotedjo, medical doctor, harpist, model, socialite
Meutya Hafid, Journalist and Deputy Chairman Commission I People's Representative Council
Nicholas Saputra, actor, class of 2002

References

 
1958 establishments in Indonesia